The 2022 IIHF World Women's U18 Championship Division II was an international under-18 women's ice hockey tournament ran by the International Ice Hockey Federation. This tournament represents the fourth tier of competition at the 2022 IIHF World Women's U18 Championship. The tournament would have originally been held in Istanbul, Turkey, from 21 to 27 January 2022, but it was rescheduled due to the COVID-19 pandemic and was played from 27 June to 5 July 2022.

Spain women's national under-18 ice hockey team won the tournament and were promoted to the 2023 Division I B.  With increased registration for 2023, Division II was expanded into two tournaments, meaning that 8th place (Kazakhstan) and 9th place (Iceland) were effectively relegated to Division II B.

First round
In the first round, the teams were drawn into three groups of three. All teams advance to the second round; they will be allocated to the second round groups according to the first round rankings.

Group A

Group B

Group C

Second round
In the second round, the teams play in three groups of three. All teams, except the third team from Group F, advance to the final round.

Group D

Group E

Group F

Final round

7th place match

5th place match

3rd place match

Final

Final standings

References

IIHF World Women's U18 Championship Division II
International ice hockey competitions hosted by Turkey